Grace Assembly of God (Chinese: 神召会恩典堂), or abbreviated as GAOG, is a Pentecostal church in Singapore. It is affiliated with the Assemblies of God USA. The senior pastor of the church is Rev. Dr. Wilson Teo.

History
 
It was founded in 1950. The church currently has an average attendance of 4,800. It holds services both at Tanglin and Bukit Batok.

Leadership

Grace Assembly currently has a staff strength of 78 led by Senior Pastor Rev. Dr. Wilson Teo. Rev. Dr. Wilson Teo took over the position from Rev Calvin Lee as of 31 December 2019.

Church Services

Today, the church has over 25 services in multiple languages, held at two locations which are attended by Gracians of all ages, seeking and worshipping God every week.

These services minister to congregations from the Children ranging from 3 to 10, English, Chinese, Youth, Young Adults and Young Professionals and Filipino. 

On average, Grace Assembly has about 4,800 people in attendance over a given weekend.

References

External links
 Grace Assembly of God website

Churches in Singapore
Assemblies of God churches
1950 establishments in Singapore